In geometry, a convex polygon is a polygon that is the boundary of a convex set. This means that the line segment between two points of the polygon is contained in the union of the interior and the boundary of the polygon. In particular, it is a simple polygon (not self-intersecting).  Equivalently, a polygon is convex if every line that does not contain any edge intersects the polygon in at most two points.

A strictly convex polygon is a convex polygon such that no line contains two of its edges. In a convex polygon, all interior angles are less than or equal to 180 degrees, while in a strictly convex polygon all interior angles are strictly less than 180 degrees.

Properties 

The following properties of a simple polygon are all equivalent to convexity:
Every internal angle is strictly less than 180 degrees.
Every point on every line segment between two points inside or on the boundary of the polygon remains inside or on the boundary.
The polygon is entirely contained in a closed half-plane defined by each of its edges.
For each edge, the interior points are all on the same side of the line that the edge defines.
The angle at each vertex contains all other vertices in its edges and interior.
The polygon is the convex hull of its edges.

Additional properties of convex polygons include:
The intersection of two convex polygons is a convex polygon.
A convex polygon may be triangulated in linear time through a fan triangulation, consisting in adding diagonals from one vertex to all other vertices.
Helly's theorem: For every collection of at least three convex polygons: if the intersection of every three of them is nonempty, then the whole collection has a nonempty intersection.
Krein–Milman theorem: A convex polygon is the convex hull of its vertices. Thus it is fully defined by the set of its vertices, and one only needs the corners of the polygon to recover the entire polygon shape.
Hyperplane separation theorem: Any two convex polygons with no points in common have a separator line. If the polygons are closed and at least one of them is compact, then there are even two parallel separator lines (with a gap between them).
Inscribed triangle property: Of all triangles contained in a convex polygon, there exists a triangle with a maximal area whose vertices are all polygon vertices. 
Inscribing triangle property: every convex polygon with area A can be inscribed in a triangle of area at most equal to 2A. Equality holds (exclusively) for a parallelogram.
The mean width of a convex polygon is equal to its perimeter divided by pi. So its width is the diameter of a circle with the same perimeter as the polygon.

Every polygon inscribed in a circle (such that all vertices of the polygon touch the  circle), if not self-intersecting, is convex. However, not every convex polygon can be inscribed in a circle.

Strict convexity

The following properties of a simple polygon are all equivalent to strict convexity:

Every internal angle is strictly less than 180 degrees.
Every line segment between two points in the interior, or between two points on the boundary but not on the same edge, is strictly interior to the polygon (except at its endpoints if they are on the edges).
For each edge, the interior points and the boundary points not contained in the edge are on the same side of the line that the edge defines.
The angle at each vertex contains all other vertices in its interior (except the given vertex and the two adjacent vertices).

Every nondegenerate triangle is strictly convex.

See also
Convex curve
Concave polygon a simple polygon that is not convex 
Convex polytope
Cyclic polygon

Tangential polygon

References

External links

http://www.rustycode.com/tutorials/convex.html

Convex geometry
Types of polygons